Stelvideo is an unincorporated community on the southern boundary of Richland Township, Darke County, Ohio, United States, at the intersection of  Horatio-Harris Creek Road and Arcanum-Bears Mills Road.

History
Stelvideo was laid out in 1851. A post office called Stelvideo was established in 1860, and remained in operation until 1914.

References

Unincorporated communities in Darke County, Ohio
Unincorporated communities in Ohio
1851 establishments in Ohio
Populated places established in 1851